Shin Dong-hyuk (born 17 July 1987) is a South Korean football midfielder, who formerly played for Incheon United.

Club career
Shin joined Incheon United for the 2011 season, and his first league appearance for his new club was as a substitute against Gyeongnam FC, playing most of the second half of the match.

Club career statistics

References

External links

1987 births
Living people
South Korean footballers
Ulsan Hyundai FC players
Incheon United FC players
Daejeon Hana Citizen FC players
K League 1 players
K League 2 players
Association football midfielders